All About That Basie is an album by the Count Basie Orchestra, released on September 7, 2018. On the album, the Count Basie Orchestra, now under the leadership of trumpeter Scotty Barnhart, remakes classic swing and blues classics with guest appearances by modern artists including Take 6, Stevie Wonder, and several notable jazz musicians.

Track listing
Credits taken from AllMusic.

References

2018 albums
Count Basie Orchestra albums